Walsingham is a surname. Notable people with the surname include:
 Thomas Walsingham, (died ) an English chronicler
 Robert Walsingham (shipwright), coxswain of the Sea Venture and shipwright of the Patience
 Thomas Walsingham (literary patron), a patron of Christopher Marlowe
 Thomas de Grey, 6th Baron Walsingham (1843–1919), British politician and amateur entomologist
 Francis Walsingham, (1532–1590) the spymaster of Queen Elizabeth I of England
 Robert Walsingham (pirate), 17th-century Anglo-Turkish English pirate
 Robert Boyle-Walsingham (1736–1780), also known as Robert Walsingham, English politician, MP for Fowey and Knaresborough
 Any of the Barons Walsingham
 Melusina von der Schulenburg, Countess of Walsingham, an illegitimate daughter of King George I of Great Britain and Ehrengard Melusine von der Schulenburg, Duchess of Kendal and Munster
 Edmund Walsingham ( – 1550), Lieutenant of the Tower of London during the reign of King Henry VIII

English toponymic surnames